"Let's Just Do It" is a posthumous single by American rapper Lisa "Left Eye" Lopes, and is the lead single from her posthumous album, Eye Legacy. Originally recorded by Lopes and her TLC bandmate Tionne "T-Boz" Watkins in 1998 for the group's third studio album FanMail, the track was shelved until 2009, when it was remixed to feature new vocals from fellow member Rozonda "Chilli" Thomas and rapper Missy Elliott.

Background
The song was originally produced by Dwight Reynolds and recorded in 1998 by Lopes and Watkins for possible inclusion in the 1999 multi-platinum FanMail. The song was left off the album as the hip hop beats did not fit the album's concept, as LaFace Records chose to have the album focus on futuristic electronic production.

In 2008, when Eye Legacy began production, "Let's Just Do It" was selected to be included on the album and be released as the lead single. Elliott and Thomas recorded new vocals on the song, and the track was remixed with a dance beat.

On June 2, 2014, a new version of the song was released that featured a new beat and rap from Lopes' younger sister Reigndrop Lopes.

Reception
"Let's Just Do It" received a positive review from Billboard magazine: "The energy that made the trio's upbeat singles international smashes is evident here, along with Lisa's essence—a reminder that TLC was among the most successful female R&B groups of all time. Originally recorded in 1998, the Heavy Weights and Marcus DL's production builds a catchy and contemporary rhythmic structure."

Chart performance
The track sold fewer than 1,000 downloads during the week of the single's release, according to Nielsen SoundScan. Because of this, the song failed to chart in the US Billboard charts and failed to be released worldwide.

Release history

Versions
 Original version (featuring T-Boz) – 4:47
 Album version (featuring Missy Elliott and TLC) – 3:37
 Album/Urban remix (featuring Missy Elliott and TLC) – 3:35
 Japan remix (featuring Missy Elliott and TLC) – 3:39
 EyeReignMix (featuring Missy Elliott, TLC and Reigndrop Lopes) – 3:46

References

External links

2009 singles
Lisa Lopes songs
Missy Elliott songs
Songs written by Lisa Lopes
Songs written by Missy Elliott
TLC (group) songs
1998 songs
Songs released posthumously